English Biscuit Manufacturers, previously known as Peek Freans Pakistan, is a Pakistani biscuits manufacturer based in Karachi, Pakistan. According to Nielsen survey, EBM enjoys a 45% market share. They are the makers of Peek Freans biscuits and are owner of Pied Piper trademark.

Sooper, a brand of EBM accounts for almost half of the company revenues.

History
It was founded in 1966 as Peek Freans Pakistan Limited.

In 2013, Sooper  crossed the Rs 10 billion mark.

In November 2021, Sooper Soft Bakes, a totally different brand extension of Sooper biscuits is launched.

Brands
Marie (1971)
Butter Puff (1974)
Peanut Pik (1984)
Zeera (1984)
Gluco (1987)
Rio (1996) Chocolate, Strawberry & Cotton Candy
Chocolate Sandwich(1996)
Lemon Sandwich(1996)
Party(1996)
Sooper (1996)
Farm House Cookies (2011)
Jam Delight
Click
Nan Khatai (2015)
Chocolicious (2015)
Cake Up (2018)
Choco Bites (2019)
Cake-UP Triple Chocolate (2019)
Cake-UP Sandwich (2020)

References

Manufacturing companies based in Karachi
Food and drink companies based in Karachi
Food and drink companies established in 1966
Pakistani brands
Food manufacturers of Pakistan
Privately held companies of Pakistan
Pakistani companies established in 1966